Benita Vēja ( Vilerte, born January 15, 1948, in Kuldīga) is a Latvian chess master who won the Latvian Chess Championship for women in 1966.

Chess career
Benita Vēja started to play chess in early childhood and won the Latvian Girl championship in 1961 but in 1963 she won Soviet Girl championship. Rīga women chess championship she won twice: 1972 and 1975.
She won the Latvian Chess Championship for women in 1966 (after match victory over the sixties Latvian women chess leader Astra Klovāne – 2,5:1,5), was the runner-up in 1963, and 1972 and won the third prize in 1964, 1967, and 1969.
Benita Vēja played for Latvia in Soviet team chess championship in 1967 and 1972 and for team "Daugava" in Soviet team chess cup in 1964, 1966, 1968, and 1971. In Soviet team chess championship in 1967 she won second place at girl board, but in Soviet team chess cup in 1971 she won third place at first women board.

Personal life
By profession Benita Vēja is an engineer mathematician. Her brother Jānis Vilerts (1943–2001) was director at the Kuldiga Chess School but her sister Tamāra Vilerte is a Woman Grandmaster.

References

 Žuravļevs, N.; Dulbergs, I.; Kuzmičovs, G. (1980), Latvijas šahistu jaunrade, Rīga, Avots., pp. 107 – 108 (in Latvian).

External links
 
 

1948 births
Living people
People from Kuldīga
Latvian female chess players
Soviet female chess players